The 2007 CECAFA Cup is the 31st edition of the football tournament that involves teams from East and Central Africa.

All matches are to be played from 8 to 22 December 2007 at the National Stadium, Dar es Salaam, Tanzania and Sheikh Amri Abeid Stadium, Arusha, Tanzania.

Information
 The Cecafa Senior Challenge Cup received a major boost on Tuesday after clinching a US$4m four-year sponsorship deal with Gateway TV (GTV).
 The winner of this year's competition will receive $30,000, the second-placed team will be given $20,000, with $10,000 going to the side that comes third.
 Sudan fielded mostly their youth players ('B' team), with some senior players.

Group A

Group B

 Uganda won group on better head-to-head record against Rwanda.

Group C

Knock-out stage

Quarter-finals

Semifinals

Third place play-off

Final

Top goalscorers

References

External links
CECAFA official website
CAF official website
African football at BBC Sports

CECAFA Cup
CECAFA Cup
2007
2007 in Tanzanian sport